Education has been defined as, "teaching and learning specific skills, and also something less tangible, but more profound: the imparting of knowledge, positive judgement and well-developed wisdom. Education has as one of its fundamental aspects the imparting of culture from generation to generation (see socialization)".

While curriculum and texts for schools has been found in other areas of the ancient near east, no direct evidence—either literary or archaeological—exists for schools in ancient Israel. There is no word for school in ancient (biblical) Hebrew, the earliest reference to a "house of study" (bet hammidras) is found in the mid-Hellenistic period (2nd cent. BC) in the book of Ben Sira (51:23). 

However, the writing of the Bible as well as the variety of inscriptional material from ancient Palestine testifies to a relatively robust scribal culture that must have existed to create these textual artifacts. The best unambiguous evidence for schools in ancient Israel comes from a few abecedaries and accounting practice texts found at sites such as Izbet Sarta, Tel Zayit, Kadesh Barnea, and Kuntillet ʿAjrud. However, these were probably not schools in the traditional sense but rather an apprenticeship system located in the family.

The total literacy rate of Jews in Israel in the first centuries c.e. was "probably less than 3%". While this may seem very low by today's standards, it was relatively high in the ancient world. If we ignore women (on the ground of their not participating in society), take into consideration children above the age of seven only, forget the far-away farmers and regard literacy of the non-educated people (e.g., one who cannot read the Torah but reads a bulla, that is: pragmatic literacy), then the literacy rate (adult males in the centers), might be even 20%, a high rate in traditional society.

Torah commandments
Three Torah commandments (numbers 10, 11, 17) command provision of education in general society:
Number 10 - To read the Shema twice daily, as it is written "and thou shalt talk of them . . . when thou liest down, and when thou risest up" (Deuteronomy 6,7).
Number 11 - To learn Torah and to teach it, as it is written "thou shalt teach them diligently unto thy children" (Deuteronomy 6,7).
Number 17 - For every man to write a Torah scroll for himself, as it is written "write ye this song for you" (Deuteronomy 31,19).
Thus the father was obligated as the sole teacher of his children in Jewish history (Deut. xi. 19).

House of the teacher
The institution known as the "be rav" or "bet rabban" (house of the teacher), or as the "be safra" or "bet sefer" (house of the book), is said to have been originated by Ezra' (459 BCE) and his Great Assembly, who provided a public school in Jerusalem to secure the education of fatherless boys of the age of sixteen years and upward. However, the school system did not develop until Joshua ben Gamla (64 CE) the high priest caused public schools to be opened in every town and hamlet for all children above six or seven years of age (Babylonian Talmud, Bava Batra 21a).

Expense and conduct
The expense was borne by the community, and strict discipline was observed. However, Rav ordered Samuel ben Shilat to deal tenderly with the pupils, to refrain from corporal punishment, or at most to use a shoe-strap in correcting pupils for inattention. A stupid pupil was made monitor until able to grasp the art of learning. Raba fixed the number of pupils at twenty-five for one teacher; if the number was between twenty-five and forty an assistant teacher ("resh dukana") was necessary; and for over forty, two teachers were required.

Teaching staff
Only married men were engaged as teachers, but there is a difference of opinion regarding the qualification of the "melammed" (teacher). Raba preferred one who taught his pupils much, even though somewhat carelessly.  Rav Dimi of Nehardea, preferred one who taught his pupils little, but correctly, as an error in reading once adopted is hard to correct (ib.). It is, of course, assumed that both qualifications were rarely found in one person.

Texts and subject areas
The standard education texts were the Mishna and later the Talmud and Gemora, all hand-written until invention of printing. However significant, emphasis was placed on developing good memory skills in addition to comprehension by practice of oral repetition.

Basic education today is considered those skills that are necessary to function in society. In Ancient Israel, the child would be taught from the six broad subject areas into which the Mishna is divided, including: 
Zeraim ("Seeds"), dealing with agricultural laws and prayers 
Moed ("Festival"), pertaining to the laws of the Shabbat and the Festivals
Nashim ("Women"), concerning marriage and divorce
Nezikin ("Damages"), dealing with civil and criminal law
Kodashim ("Holy things"), regarding sacrificial rites, the Temple, and the dietary laws
Tohorot ("Purities"), pertaining to the laws of purity and impurity, including the impurity of the dead, the laws of ritual purity for the priests (Kohanim), the laws of "family purity" (the menstrual laws).

Literacy
Despite this schooling system, many children did not learn to read and write. It has been estimated that at least 90 percent of the Jewish population of Roman Palestine in the first centuries CE could merely write their own name or not write and read at all, or that the literacy rate was about 3 percent. Exact literacy rates among ancient Jews in Roman Palestine cannot be determined.

Epigraphic evidence documents that a preliminary scribal infrastructure developed over the course of the 10th century BC as state-centralization progressed, followed by a much larger infrastructure during the Neo-Assyrian period under which parts of the biblical texts were composed. Literacy then declined during the period of the exile and slowly re-established itself in the intervening centuries. Some of Israel's earliest teaching material may be reflected in some portions within the Book of Proverbs.

See also
History of ancient Israel and Judah
Jewish education

Notes and references

History of education in Asia
Education
Jewish education